Black to the Future  is a 1998 studio album by South African jazz trumpeter Hugh Masekela. The album was recorded in Mafikeng, South Africa.

Reception
Stephen Thomas Erlewine of Allmusic stated: "Black to the Future is a fairly standard latter-day Hugh Masekela album, falling somewhere between accessible worldbeat and tuneful fusion. Granted, Masekela has been mining this ground for some time, but there is a bit of a difference here, particularly the genuine sound of some of the polyrhythms and the way the group locks into a supple groove."

Track listing

Personnel
Band
Hugh Masekela – flugelhorn, backing vocals 
Jasper Cook – trombone
Don Laka – keyboards, producing, programming
Makhaya Mahlangu – flute, alto and tenor saxophone
Tuli Mike Masoka – bass
Kenny Mathaba – guitar, harmonica
Thabo Mdluli – backing vocals 
Margaret Motsage – backing vocals 
John Selolwane – guitar, backing vocals 
Jethro Shasha – drums
Vicky Vilakazi – backing vocals

Production
Kentsa Mpahlwa – engineer
Ray Staff – mastering

References

External links

 

1998 albums
Hugh Masekela albums
Shanachie Records albums